Central Virginia Community College (CVCC) is a public community college in Lynchburg, Virginia. It is part of the Virginia Community College System. Established in 1966, CVCC serves students at the main campus in Lynchburg or at one of its off-site centers in Amherst, Appomattox, Bedford, and Campbell counties.

Students
For the 2017-2018 semesters, CVCC's total headcount was 5,652 students, 55% female, 45% male. The racial makeup of the student body was:

Academics and programs

Central Virginia Community College offers 80 associate degree and career certificate programs.

References

External links
Official website

Virginia Community College System
Education in Lynchburg, Virginia
Educational institutions established in 1966
Universities and colleges accredited by the Southern Association of Colleges and Schools
Buildings and structures in Lynchburg, Virginia
1966 establishments in Virginia